Frederick William Wilson (26 March 1844 – 26 May 1924), was a British Liberal Party politician and newspaper owner.

Background
He was the second son of William Wilson, Manor House, Scarning, Norfolk and Elisa Turner, of Old Puckenham, Norfolk. He was educated at Wymondham Grammar School. He married in 1870, Mary Elizabeth Cappes of Forest Hill.

Business career
He was a farmer of his own land in Norfolk. He was called up as a volunteer to defend Chester Castle against the Fenians in 1866, 29 years after, meeting one of the attacking party as a colleague in the House of Commons. He was indentured to J. H. Tillett, editor of the Norfolk News and MP for Norwich, 1868–80. He subsequently was assistant to Sir Edward Russell on the Liverpool Daily Post. He founded the East Anglian Daily Times in 1874. He was President of the Newspaper Society of the United Kingdom in 1894, and President of the Institute of Journalists in 1907.

Political career
He was a Justice of the Peace for Suffolk. DL for Norfolk. He sat as Liberal MP for Norfolk Mid from 1895 to 1906. He first stood unsuccessfully in April 1895 before gaining the seat in July 1895;

In 1897 session he rode in the Parliamentary steeplechase, and played chess for the House of Commons of the United Kingdom against the United States House of Representatives. He was one of the founders of the Norfolk Small Holdings Association, and took great interest in all movements calculated to keep the villager in the village.  
He retired at the General Election of January 1906. He did not stand for parliament again.

Sources
Who Was Who
British parliamentary election results 1885–1918, Craig, F. W. S.

References

External links 
Who Was Who; http://www.ukwhoswho.com

1844 births
1924 deaths
Liberal Party (UK) MPs for English constituencies
UK MPs 1900–1906
People from Scarning